The following is a list of Major League Baseball players, retired or active.

Mi-My

References

External links
Last Names starting with M – Baseball-Reference.com

 Mi-Mz